Biogno is a village and former municipality in the canton of Ticino, Switzerland.

It was first recorded in 1022 as Biogno.

Biogno municipality had 232 inhabitants in 1850, which increased to 369 in 1900. In 1925 the municipality was split in two to form the two new municipalities Breganzona and Bioggio. The village Biogno was located in Breganzona, except for Mulini which was moved to Bioggio.

Bibliography
Valerio Crivelli, San Quirico. 1489-1989. Biogno-Breganzona, Aurora SA, Canobbio 1989.
Nicola Pfund, Breganzona: echi dalla collina di ponente, Fontana Edizioni, 2005.

References

Former municipalities of Ticino
Villages in Ticino
Lugano